Pretty Wicked Moms is an American reality television series on Lifetime. The series premiered on June 4, 2013. It follows the lives of six mothers living in Atlanta, Georgia.

Cast

Emily Dees Boulden
Emily Dees Boulden "The Queen Bee" is married to Peter Boulden, with two daughters, Amzie and Atley and one son Brax. She is the owner of the fashion boutique Swank. Her husband Pete, and Miranda's husband, Chris, have been best friends since kindergarten.  She is a graduate of the University of Mississippi and a native of Philadelphia, Mississippi. Swank is located in Atlanta, Georgia Shop around Lenox.

Nicole Clemons Noles
Nicole Clemons Noles "The Doggy Mom" is the "mother" to her Shih-Tzu, Sommer, and is married to Patrick Noles. She  now has a  daughter named Natalie. She lives in Birmingham, Alabama.

Miranda Carlson
Miranda Carlson "The Southern Belle" is married to Chris and is a stay-at-home mom to their son Ledger and daughter Holland. Miranda and Emily have a long time feud from when Emily first moved to Georgia. Miranda has even publicly announced that Emily's shop is known as "Skank" instead of "Swank."

Nicole Bennett-Hragyil
Nicole Bennett-Hragyil "The Alpha Mom" is married to Craig, with a daughter, McKinley. Nicole is extremely concerned about having a healthy lifestyle, keeping her, Craig and McKinley on a strict diet. Craig Hragyil - one of the owners of KU is an ex-con who spent 3 years in prison for internet fraud and the theft of senior citizens’ savings.

Meredith Underwood
Meredith Underwood "The Newbie" is married to Brad and is a stay-at-home mother to their daughter, Addison. They named their daughter after the character Addison Montgomery from Grey’s Anatomy and Private Practice.

Marci Rubin Gold
Marci Rubin Gold "The Divorcee" is recently divorced and raising her three kids, sons Dylan and Andrew, and daughter, Jordan. She appeared on LifeTime's Dance Moms Holiday Special as an audience member with her daughter Jordan.

Episodes

Reception
Reception of the new series has been uniformly negative. Hitfix responded to the show: "OK, Lifetime, you win. Somehow you've found women more vile, more petulant, and possibly dumber than most of the women in The Real Housewives franchise. Congratulations. I think Pretty Wicked Moms may be a sign of the coming Rapture, or maybe just confirmation that at least some of the mean girls we all remember from high school didn't change or mature in any way."

Dennis Perkins at The A.V. Club rated the show an 'F', saying that "If it were discovered that this depiction of the petty, insipid catfighting amongst a sextet of monied Georgia mothers was actually the creation of a rabid men’s movement hell bent on turning public opinion in favor of repealing the 19th amendment, it would make more sense than a network at least nominally vested in women’s issues choosing to air a show that makes the entire gender a dispiriting, hateful laughingstock."

References

External links
Official site

2013 American television series debuts
2013 American television series endings
Lifetime (TV network) original programming
2010s American reality television series
English-language television shows
Women in Georgia (U.S. state)